Karl Wilhelm von Dalla Torre (14 July 1850 – 6 April 1928) was an Austrian taxonomist, entomologist and botanist.

Dalla Torre was born in Kitzbühel, Tyrol.  He studied natural sciences at the University of Innsbruck. He then worked in the University as an entomologist and in 1895 became Professor of Zoology at the University of Innsbruck.   He died in Innsbruck, aged 77.

Works
Partial List
Catalogus hymenopterorum hucusque descriptorum systematicus et synonymicus. vol. 1-10. Leipzig 1894-
with Anton Hartinger [Ill.] Atlas der Alpenflora. Wien: Verl. d. Dt. u. Österr. Alpenvereins, 1882-1884
Die Alpenpflanzen im Wissensschatz der deutschen Alpenbewohner (1905)
Flora der gefürsteten Grafschaft Tirol, des Landes Vorarlberg und des Fürstentums Liechtenstein, gemeinsam mit Ludwig von Sarnthein (1900-1913).
with Heinrich von Ficker Klimatographie von Tirol und Vorarlberg. Wien: Gerold, 1909.
 Genera Siphonogamarum

For other Catalogues of Lepidoptera, Coleoptera and Hymenoptera and other works see Links

References

External links

 
BHL Catalogus Hymenopterorum hucusque descriptorum systematicus et synonymicus Lipsiae, G. Engelmann,1892-1902. Volumes 6, 8 and 9
BHL Cynipidae, bearbeitet von dr. K. W. von Dalla Torre  und prof. dr. J. J. Kieffer Series: Das Tierreich, 24. lfg. Hymenoptera Berlin,R. Friedländer und Sohn,1910
BHL Handwörterbuch der Zoologie. Unter Mitwirkung von Prof. Dr. von Dalla Torre, bearb. von Dr. Friedrich Knauer with Friedrich Carl Knauer'' Stuttgart,F. Enke,1887.

19th-century Austrian botanists
Austrian entomologists
Austrian taxonomists
1850 births
1928 deaths
Hymenopterists
Botanists with author abbreviations
Austrian untitled nobility
Karl Wilhelm
People from Kitzbühel
20th-century Austrian botanists
19th-century Austrian zoologists
20th-century Austrian zoologists